Amarwant Singh (born 19 March 1989 in Ludhiana, Punjab) is an Indian footballer who last played as a defender for Pailan Arrows in the I-League.

Career

Pailan Arrows
After spending three seasons at three clubs as a youth player Amarwant joined I-League club Pailan Arrows for the 2011–12 I-League season. He made his professional debut against HAL on 18 September 2011 in the 2011 Indian Federation Cup in which Pailan won 1–0. He then played his second game against Mumbai on 20 September 2011 in which Pailan won again 2–1.

Career statistics

Club
Statistics accurate as of 30 April 2012

References

Indian footballers
1989 births
Living people
I-League players
Indian Arrows players
Association football defenders
Footballers from Punjab, India